Bank of Beijing Co., Ltd. (abb. BOB) is an urban commercial bank based in Beijing, China. According to the bank, most of the revenue came from Beijing, despite that the banking group had more than half of the branches located outside the direct-controlled municipality (302 out of 559 branches were located outside Beijing). Beijing Municipal People's Government and the Netherlands-based multinational bank ING Bank were the major shareholders of the bank.

, the bank, as a listed company, is a constituent of SSE 180 Index, as well as its sub-index, the blue chip SSE 50 Index. It was also part of pan-China indexes such as FTSE China A50 Index and CSI 100 Index.

History
(or founded on 8 January 1996 according to another source; the establishment of the bank was approved by various departments in June–December 1995.) The bank was founded as a holding company for the credit unions in the city. However, in 1997, it was discovered that one of the former credit union of the banking group in Zhongguancun, had an accounting scandal with a huge deficit. The manager of that branch was arrested in 2011 and was sentenced 14 years imprisonment in 2012; the governor of that branch was arrested in 1998 and was sentenced capital punishment in 2003.

In 2004, China Banking Regulatory Commission approved the renaming to Bank of Beijing. It became effective on 1 January 2005.

In 2005, the bank became a Sino-foreign joint venture, which ING Group purchased 19.9% shares of the bank. On 19 September 2007, the bank became a listed company on the Shanghai Stock Exchange. The bank also purchased a Sino-foreign joint venture insurance company, which was previous known as ING Capital Life Insurance in 2010, from municipal-owned Beijing Capital Group. , the bank still owned 50% stake of the insurer, which now known as BOB-Cardif Life.

In December 2017, ING subscribed the capital increase of the bank, despite that the ownership ratio of the ordinary shares was still diluted from 13.6% to 13.0%. Before the capital increase, Beijing municipal government only owned 8.84% shares via Beijing State-owned Assets Management, as well as additional 5.08% via Beijing Energy Investment Holdings. However, it also caused a minor controversy in 2013, as Ren Zhiqiang, an independent director of the bank, accused the State-owned Assets Supervision and Administration Commission (SASAC) of Beijing municipal government had influenced the election of the supervisory board of the bank, which Qiang Xin, the deputy of Beijing SASAC was elected as the chairwoman of the supervisory board, replacing Shi Yuan. Qiang also served as the Deputy Party Committee Secretary of the bank since 2010. Qiang was succeeded by Zeng Ying in 2016; she was the deputy of Beijing Bureau of China Banking Regulatory Commission in 2011.

The bank also faced another minor scandal in February 2015, in which a director of the bank, Lu Haijun was under investigation for corruption. He was dismissed by the shareholders' meeting during 2015. Since 2008, Lu was also the chairman of Beijing Energy Investment Holdings, a shareholder of the bank. Lu was sentenced 11 years imprisonment for his crime as the manager of Beijing Energy Investment Holdings in 2016.

Joint ventures

 BOB-Cardif Life (50%)

Equity investments

 UnionPay (1.28%)
 Bank of Langfang (3.57%)
 Nongan BOB Rural Bank (25.5%)
 Hebei Lizhou BOB Rural Commercial Bank (30%)

Shareholders
 and the Netherlands-based multinational bank ING Bank were the major shareholders of the bank. , ING owned 13.03%, Beijing municipal government, via Beijing State-owned Assets Management, owned 8.63% ordinary shares, as well as additional 8.59% shares owned via Beijing Energy Investment Holdings. The third largest shareholder, Macro-Link Holding, was a private company.

Ranking
The bank was ranked as the 73rd in the world (and 15th in the mainland China) in 2017 Top 1000 World Banks by The Banker magazine, in terms of banks' equity; The bank was ranked 155th in 2010 (12th inside the mainland China). and 77th in 2016 in Top 1000 World Banks.

See also
 Huaxia Bank, another Beijing based medium-sized bank, which was also a Sino-foreign joint venture

Footnotes

References

External links
  

Banks established in 1996
Companies based in Beijing
Banks of China
Companies owned by the provincial government of China
Chinese brands
Companies in the CSI 100 Index
Companies listed on the Shanghai Stock Exchange
ING Group
Chinese companies established in 1996
1996 establishments in China